Panania railway station is located on the East Hills line, serving the Sydney suburb of Panania. It is served by Sydney Trains T8 Airport & South line services.

History
Panania station opened on 21 December 1931 when the line was extended from Kingsgrove to East Hills.

On 9 December 1985, the line from Revesby to East Hills was duplicated with a new track laid to the north of the existing one.

Upgrades
In October 2011, the surrounding bus stops and station entrance were upgraded. In December 2014, scoping began for a further upgrade. In July 2018, the upgrade was completed which included new lifts, stairs, weather canopies, signage, refurbishments, toilets and CCTV.

Platforms and services

Transport Links
Panania Station has bus stops located on both Braesmere Road on the north side and Anderson Avenue and Weston Street on the southside. All routes are operated by Transdev NSW.

Braesmere Road
S5: Padstow Station to Milperra
925: East Hills to Lidcombe via Bankstown
It is also the side where Train Replacement buses stop during trackwork.

Anderson Avenue/Weston Street
923: To Bankstown via Picnic Point (Some services start at Picnic Point Boatshed)
924: East Hills to Bankstown

Panania station is served by one NightRide route.
N40: East Hills to City Town Hall

References

External links

Panania station details Transport for New South Wales

City of Canterbury-Bankstown
Railway stations in Sydney
Easy Access railway stations in Sydney
Railway stations in Australia opened in 1931
East Hills railway line